Chapelgill Hill is a hill in the Culter Hills range, part of the Southern Uplands of Scotland. It is frequently climbed from the north-west, taking in the range's, and South Lanarkshire's, highest summit, Culter Fell.

Subsidiary SMC Summits

References

Donald mountains
Mountains and hills of the Southern Uplands
Mountains and hills of South Lanarkshire